Willems is a commune in the Nord department in northern France.

Heraldry

Population

See also
Communes of the Nord department

References

External links 
 
  

Communes of Nord (French department)
French Flanders